Senator Patrick may refer to:

Dan Patrick (politician) (born 1950), Texas State Senate
John Patrick (Maine politician) (born 1954), Maine State Senate